Cornelis Jacobsz Schout (c.1570 – after 1621), was a Dutch Golden Age member of the Haarlem schutterij.

He was the brother of the judge Jan Jacobsz Schout and the notary Pieter Jacobsz Schout and became the father of the ensign Jacob Cornelisz Schout. He was a lieutenant of the St. George militia in Haarlem from 1612-1615 and was captain 1618-1621. He was portrayed by Frans Hals along with his son in The Banquet of the Officers of the St George Militia Company in 1616.

References

Cornelis Jacobsz Schout in De Haarlemse Schuttersstukken, by Jhr. Mr. C.C. van Valkenburg, pp. 67, Haerlem : jaarboek 1958, ISSN 0927-0728, on the website of the North Holland Archives

1570s births
1620s deaths
Frans Hals
People from Haarlem